A Life at Stake is a 1955 American film noir directed by Paul Guilfoyle and starring Angela Lansbury, Keith Andes and Claudia Barrett. It was an independent production, made and distributed outside the Hollywood studio system.

Plot summary 
Down-on-his-luck Los Angeles architect and builder Edward Shaw (Keith Andes) is approached by Doris Hillman (Angela Lansbury) with a business proposal: buying land together, on which he would build houses that she would then sell, using her experience as a former real estate broker. Her husband, Gus Hillman, a wealthy businessman, would be willing to contribute half a million dollars as capital for the venture.

Doris quickly seems interested in more than a purely professional relationship. Shaw starts an affair with her and accepts the business offer. However, an accidental discovery leaves him convinced that the Hillmans' interest lies less in the long-term profits of the venture than in the $175,000 key man insurance policy he took on himself as a precondition for the deal, and that an attempt on his life is imminent.

Madge, the younger sister of Doris, develops a romantic interest in Shaw as well. Without knowing what Doris has planned, she reveals to Shaw that her sister was married previously to a man who died in Wyoming when his car crashed over a bridge. Shaw ends up drugged by Gus Hillman and barely keeps his car from going off a cliff.

The police are skeptical about his story and the insurance company refuses to cancel the policy, Hillman having portrayed Shaw as a man who is trying to steal his wife. Madge teams with Shaw to try to foil her sister's scheme, but Doris lures him to a mountain cabin and shoots him. A wounded Shaw sees both Hillmans struggle then fall to their deaths through a clifftop doorway, just minutes before Madge and the cops arrive.

Cast 
Angela Lansbury as Doris Hillman
Keith Andes as Edward Shaw
Douglass Dumbrille as Gus Hillman
Claudia Barrett as Madge Neilan
Jane Darwell as Landlady
Gavin Gordon as Sam Pearson
Charles Maxwell as Lt. Hoff
William Henry as Myles Norman
Kathleen Mulqueen as Mary
Dan Sturkie as Officer Biff
Jeane Wood as Mabel, the maid
Robert Haver as Mechanic

Soundtrack 
 "Summer Interlude" (by Hank McCune and Les Baxter)

External links 
 

1955 films
1955 drama films
American drama films
American black-and-white films
Films set in Los Angeles
1950s English-language films
Films directed by Paul Guilfoyle
1950s American films